8th Reconnaissance Regiment may refer to:

8th Reconnaissance Regiment (14th Canadian Hussars)
8th Reconnaissance Regiment (Australia)